Golyamata Gramada (‘Big Pile’) is one of the largest stone rivers on Vitosha Mountain, Bulgaria.  The feature is situated in the upper valley of Vitoshka Bistritsa River in Bistrishko Branishte Nature Reserve, extending near 1 km, and up to 300 m wide.  The stone river is ‘descending’ from elevation 1900 m above sea level at the foothills of Golyam Rezen Peak to 1550 m off the track between Bistritsa village and Aleko site (1810 m), the most popular tourist centre on Vitosha Mountain accessible also from Sofia by gondola lift.

See also
 Bistrishko Branishte
 Vitosha

Google view
 Golyamata Gramada (‘Big Pile’) Stone River, Vitosha Mountain, Bulgaria. (centred on the feature)

Sources

Rock formations of Bulgaria
Vitosha
Landforms of Sofia City Province